Skan is an album by English neo-progressive band Twelfth Night. Recorded in 1979, it was never officially released, though copies of the tape have circulated among music fans.

Production
Skan comprises the first studio recordings made by Twelfth Night, its first line up having been completed when Clive Mitten joined in late 1978. Production took place in March 1979 at the University of Reading, where the band also played a concert in summer of that year.  With the exception of "Für Helene Part I", the tracks, all written by the band, were recorded as a live performance in an empty hall. The album takes its title from the name of the company from which the band had hired its PA.

Some of the album tracks differ from how they came to be known, with "Für Helene Part I" being longer than the version later used in live sets. Parts of the Skan version of this track became part of the experimental "Sequences", which itself went under several revisions during the band's career. "Encore" and "Four and Three" were later renamed "Encore Une Fois" and "Entropy" respectively, the latter track acquiring second and third parts, separately known as "C.R.A.B." and "World Without End", both of which were recorded separately for later albums.

Track listing
 "Für Helene Part I" (14:00) 
 "Sequences" (10:08) 
 "Four and Three" (5:30) 
 "Encore" (6:08) 
 "Für Helene Part II" (12:19)

Personnel
Brian Devoil drums, percussion 
Clive Mitten bass guitar, keyboards, classical guitar 
Andy Revell electric and acoustic guitar

References 

1979 albums
Twelfth Night (band) albums
Unreleased albums
Demo albums